The Brabham BT37 was a Formula One racing car designed by Ralph Bellamy for the Brabham team to use in the 1972 Formula One season. It was relatively unsuccessful compared to Brabham's earlier and later cars such as the BT19 or the BT44. In the 18 races it was fielded, it collected no wins, no pole positions and no fastest laps. The best results were two fourth place-finishes for Carlos Reutemann and Andrea de Adamich. It generally achieved poor qualifying results, the best being fifth for Reutemann on two occasions.

In 1974 and 1975, it also raced at the RAC British Hill Climb Championship.
It is also notable for giving John Watson his Formula 1 debut in 1973.

Complete Formula One World Championship results
(key) (results in bold indicate pole position, results in italics indicate fastest lap)

* Total points scored by all Brabham cars

References

Brabham Formula One cars